A red brick university (or redbrick university) was originally one of the nine civic universities founded in the major industrial cities of England in the 19th century. 

However, with the 1960s proliferation of plate glass universities and the reclassification of polytechnics in the Further and Higher Education Act 1992 as post-1992 universities, all British universities founded in the late 19th and early 20th centuries in major cities are now sometimes referred to as "red brick". 

Six of the original redbrick institutions, or their predecessor institutes, gained university status before World War I and were initially established as civic science or engineering colleges. Eight of the nine original institutions are members of the Russell Group.

Origins of the term and use
The term red brick or redbrick was coined by Edgar Allison Peers, a professor of Spanish at the University of Liverpool, to describe the civic universities, while using the pseudonym "Bruce Truscot" in his 1943 book Redbrick University. Although Peers used red brick in the title of the original book, he used redbrick adjectivally in the text and in the title of the 1945 sequel. He is said to have later regretted his use of red brick in the title. The term red brick for this category of universities is used as a contrast to the older more established universities that were all stone masonry constructions. The use of bricks was seen as a cheaper and less traditional alternative and therefore not as highly regarded, reflected in the general view of these new universities compared to the established ones.

Peers's reference was inspired by the fact that the Victoria Building at the University of Liverpool (designed by Alfred Waterhouse and completed in 1892 as the main building for University College, Liverpool) is built from a distinctive red pressed brick, with terracotta decorative dressings. On this basis the University of Liverpool claims to be the original "red brick" institution, although the titular, fictional Redbrick University was a cipher for all the civic universities of the day.

While the University of Liverpool was an inspiration for the "red brick" university alluded to in Peers' book, receiving university status in 1903, the University of Birmingham was the first of the civic universities to gain independent university status in 1900 and the university has stated that the popularity of the term "red brick" owes much to its own Chancellor's Court, constructed from Accrington red brick. The University of Birmingham grew from the Mason Science College (opened two years before University College Liverpool in 1880), an elaborate red brick and terracotta building in central Birmingham which was demolished in 1962.

Civic university movement 
These universities were distinguished by being non-collegiate institutions that admitted men without reference to religion or background and concentrated on imparting to their students "real-world" skills, often linked to engineering and medicine. In this sense they owed their structural heritage to the Humboldt University of Berlin, which emphasised practical knowledge over the academic sort. This distinguished the red brick universities from the ancient English universities of Oxford and Cambridge and from the newer (although still pre-Victorian) University of Durham, collegiate institutions which concentrated on divinity and the liberal arts, and imposed religious tests (e.g. assent to the Thirty-Nine Articles) on staff and students. Scotland's ancient universities (St Andrews, Glasgow, Aberdeen and Edinburgh) were founded on a different basis between 1400 and 1600.

The first wave of large civic red brick universities all gained official university status before the First World War: all of these institutions have origins dating back to older medical or engineering colleges, and were located in the industrial centres of the late Victorian and Edwardian eras that required strong scientific and technical workforces. These universities developed out of various 19th-century private research and education institutes in industrial cities known as university colleges, and presented their students for external examinations of the University of London or were part of the federal Victoria University. The 1824 Manchester Mechanics' Institute formed the basis of the Manchester Institute of Science and Technology (UMIST), and thus led towards the current University of Manchester formed in 2004. The University of Birmingham has origins dating back to the 1825 Birmingham Medical School. The University of Leeds also owes its foundations to a medical school: the 1831 Leeds School of Medicine. The University of Bristol began with the 1876 University College, Bristol, the University of Liverpool with a University College in 1881, and the University of Sheffield with a medical school in 1828, Firth College in 1879 and a technical school in 1884, which merged to form a university college in 1897. Of the redbricks that gained independent university status later, Newcastle owed its beginnings to a medical school established in 1834 and affiliated to Durham University from 1852, and a college of science established, in partnership with Durham, in 1871. Reading was established as an extension college by the University of Oxford in 1892, incorporating pre-existing schools of art and science, while Nottingham was established as a civic college in 1881 and students were awarded degrees by the University of London until it received its Royal Charter in 1948.

Combined English Universities was a university constituency in the UK Parliament created by the Representation of the People Act 1918 for graduates of Durham University and the six pre-World War One red bricks (Birmingham, Bristol, Leeds, Liverpool, Manchester, and Sheffield). Graduates of Oxford, Cambridge, and London had already been enfranchised and graduates of the University of Wales were enfranchised at the same time. Reading University was added to the Combined English Universities constituency in 1928 (prior to this its graduates, taking London degrees, would have joined the London constituency). The constituency was abolished in 1950.

Other institutions

Various other civic institutions with origins dating from the 19th and early to mid-20th centuries have also been described as "red brick". According to historian William Whyte of the University of Oxford, Truscott's original definition includes the University of Dundee (originally an independent university college, before becoming a constituent college of the University of St Andrews), Newcastle University (previously a college of the University of Durham, and noted by Truscot as "perhaps" being included), and the Welsh university colleges (not named, but could include Aberystwyth (1872), Cardiff (1883), Bangor (1885) and Swansea (1920)). Notably, Whyte does not include Reading or Nottingham, which Truscot lists in his second edition.

Many other institutions share similar characteristics to the original civic universities, namely those in the second wave of civic universities before the advent of the plate glass universities in 1961. These universities were similar to the red bricks in that they evolved from local university colleges and (with the exception of Keele) awarded external degrees of the University of London before being granted full university status; they differ in that they became universities later, after the Second World War (with the exception of Reading) rather than before the First World War. The Robbins Report lists University of Reading, University of Southampton, University of Hull, University of Exeter, University of Leicester and Keele University as being "younger civic universities". Of these, the University of Reading, founded in the late 19th century as an extension college of the University of Oxford and the only university to receive its charter between the two world wars, describes itself as a "red brick" university.

Queen's University Belfast gained university status in 1908 during the same period as the English red brick universities, having previously been established in 1845 as a college of the Queen's University of Ireland (later Royal University of Ireland). As a result, it meets the dictionary definition of a red brick university, and is sometimes named as such.

Department for Education research in 2016 split universities into four categories: ancient (pre-1800), red brick (1800–1960), plate glass (1960-1992), and post-1992.

See also 
 Ancient universities
 Ancient universities of Scotland
 Armorial of UK universities
 Campus university
 List of universities in the UK
 Maple League of Universities (Canada)
 Post-1992 university
 Plate glass university
 Sandstone universities (Australia)

References

Further reading
 Whyte, William. Redbrick: A Social and Architectural History of Britain's Civic Universities (2015).

Lists of universities and colleges in the United Kingdom
Universities in the United Kingdom
Universities and colleges in the United Kingdom
Brick buildings and structures
Colloquial terms for groups of universities and colleges